Raw is the debut album by American singer Alyson Williams, released in 1989 on the Def Jam Recordings record label. It contains the singles "Sleep Talk" (UK No. 17) "My Love Is So Raw" (UK No. 34) and "I Need Your Lovin'" (UK No. 8).

Critical reception

In a retrospective review for AllMusic, Craig Lytle gave the album four out of five stars, saying that "[Williams] comes up with one outstanding effort after another as she covers the spectrum of R&B, jazz, dance, and rap."

Track listing

Note
Tracks 12 and 13 feature on the CD version only.

Personnel
Adapted from AllMusic.

Tony Adderly – drum programming
Toyce Anderson – stylist
Chandra Armstead – background vocals
James Austin – bass, drums
Vincent Bell – drum programming, percussion, producer, vocal arrangement
Joe Blaney – engineer, mixing
Blue Magic – guest artist, background vocals
Steve Breck – keyboards
Jocelyn Brown – guest artist, background vocals
Priscilla Burrel – background vocals
Mike Campbell – guitar
John Cooksey – drums
Bruce Davidson – photography
Dennis Davis – drums
Max Ehrmann – liner notes
Lisa Fischer – guest artist, background vocals
Mike Ford – bass
Michael Gabriel – drums, keyboards
Fredrick Gordon – keyboards, piano, strings, vocal arrangement
Omar Hakim – drums, guest artist
Connie Harvey – background vocals
Vincent Henry – saxophone
Rod Hui – engineer
Phillip Ingram – background vocals
Fran Jay – background vocals
Barry Sonjohn Johnson – bass
Oran "Juice" Jones – guest artist, primary artist
Abdul Kalig – producer, programming
Frederick Lewis – photography
Peter Lord – keyboards
Tommy McConnell – drum programming, engineer
Denzil Miller – guitar, keyboards, producer, programming
Ted Mills – primary artist, producer
Alvin Moody – bass, engineer, producer, vocal arrangement
Wendell Morrison – background vocals 
Najee – guest artist, saxophone
Nikki D – featured artist, primary artist
Paul Pesco – guest artist, guitar
Marc Raboy – make-up, photography
Eric "Vietnam" Sadler – producer
Bill Saxon – saxophone
Tony Sellari – art direction
Christopher Shaw – assistant engineer
Hank Shocklee – producer
Russell Simmons – drum programming, producer, vocal arrangement
Chuck Stanley – primary artist, background vocals
Ty Stephens – background vocals
Bill Stephney – producer
Annette Taylor – background vocals
Lee Truesdale – background vocals
Elai Tubo – drum programming, remastering
Alyson Williams – liner notes, performer, primary artist, vocal arrangement, background vocals
Maurice Wingate – keyboards, producer, alto sax, vocal arrangement
Abdul Zurhi – guitar

Charts and certifications

Weekly charts

Year-end charts

Certifications

References

External links
Official Charts Company
Raw at Discogs

1989 debut albums
Def Jam Recordings albums